Poigny-la-Forêt is a commune in the Yvelines department in the Île-de-France in north-central France.

History

The name of the town comes from the Celtic word Pugneis meaning "clearing in the woods."

In the twelfth century, the Order of Grandmont (Haute-Vienne) founded the priory of Notre-Dame-des-Moulineaux. In 1317, following the reorganization of the Order, it became part of Ouye (see Dourdan). In 1576, the family of Angennes Poigny who ruled, built a castle. From 1643 the site has been in disrepair. Today, you can still see the choir of the church and the remains of the wall along the D107 near the rocks Angennes.

Demographics

In 2017, Poigny-la-Forêt had 931 inhabitants, down from 1,014 in 2007.

See also
Communes of the Yvelines department

References

Communes of Yvelines